Walter George "Wally" Cobb (20 November 1870 – 14 October 1933) was a rugby union player who represented Australia.

Cobb, a fullback, was born in Newcastle, NSW and claimed a total of 2 international rugby caps for Australia. His debut game was against Great Britain, at Sydney, on 5 August 1899.

References

Australian rugby union players
Australia international rugby union players
1870 births
1933 deaths
Rugby union fullbacks
Rugby union players from Newcastle, New South Wales